Ulf Adolf Roger Dinkelspiel (4 July 1939 – 9 January 2017) was a Swedish Moderate Party politician and financier.

Career
Dinkelspiel was born in Stockholm in 1939, the son of Max Dinkelspiel and his wife Brita (née Björnstjerna). He attended the University of Arkansas in the United States from 1956 to 1957 and graduated from the Stockholm School of Economics in 1960. Dinkelspiel became a reserve officer in 1961 and was an employee at Bankirfirman E. Öhman J:or. AB from 1957 to 1959 and from 1961 to 1962. He was an employee at Stockholms Enskilda Bank in 1960 and became an attaché at the Ministry for Foreign Affairs in 1962. Dinkelspiel served at the Swedish Embassy in Tokyo from 1963 to 1965, at the OECD delegation in Paris from 1965 to 1967 and at the Foreign Ministry in Stockholm from 1967 to 1975.

Dinkelspiel served at the Swedish Embassy in Washington, D.C. from 1975 to 1979 and was secretary of state at the Ministry of Commerce and Industry from 1979 to 1981 and acting State Secretary for Foreign Affairs from 1981 to 1982. He was then ambassador at the Foreign Ministry in Stockholm in 1982 and chief negotiator in EC affairs from 1988 to 1991. In the government of Prime Minister of Sweden Carl Bildt, Dinkelspiel served from 1991 to 1994 as a Deputy Minister in the Ministry for Foreign Affairs with responsibility for European Affairs and Foreign Trade. He was a central figure in the negotiations for Swedish EU membership.

Dinkelspiel was known as an advocate for European integration. Since the campaign for Sweden joining the Euro, he serves as chairman of the organization Sweden in Europe.

Personal life and death
In 1969 he married Louise Ramel (born 1948), the daughter of Baron Sten Ramel and his wife Baroness Margareta (née Moltke-Huitfeldt). His son, Jan, appeared on the Swedish reality television program Expedition Robinson, finishing second place.

Dinkelspiel died from cancer on 9 January 2017 in Stockholm at the age of 77.

Awards and decorations
H. M. The King's Medal, 12th size gold (silver-gilt) medal worn around the neck on the Order of the Seraphim ribbon (1999)

Bibliography

References

1939 births
2017 deaths
Moderate Party politicians
Stockholm School of Economics alumni
Swedish people of Jewish descent
Members of the Royal Swedish Academy of Engineering Sciences
Politicians from Stockholm
Swedish bankers
Deaths from cancer in Sweden